Sleeping Gypsy is a jazz vocal album by Michael Franks, released in 1977 with Warner Bros. Records. It was Franks' third studio album after The Art of Tea and prior to Burchfield Nines.

Track listing

Personnel

Musicians
Michael Franks - vocals 
Joe Sample - keyboards (all tracks but "B'wana-He No Home" and "Down In Brazil")
Wilton Felder - bass guitar 
John Guerin - drums (all tracks but "B'wana-He No Home" and "Down In Brazil")
Larry Carlton - guitar, lead guitar on "Down In Brazil"
David Sanborn - saxophone (3,5-7)
Michael Brecker - saxophone (1,2,4)
Larry Bunker - percussion
Ray Armando - percussion (1,3,4,6,8)
João Palma - drums on "B'wana-He No Home" and "Down In Brazil" 
João Donato - piano on "B'wana-He No Home" and "Down In Brazil" 
Hélio Delmiro - rhythm guitar on "B'wana-He No Home" and "Down In Brazil"
Claus Ogerman - strings arrangements, conductor
Israel Baker - concertmaster

Support
Recording and mixing – Al Schmitt
Orchestra arrangement and conducting – Claus Ogerman

References

Bibliography

Michael Franks (musician) albums
1977 albums
Albums conducted by Claus Ogerman
Albums arranged by Claus Ogerman
Albums produced by Tommy LiPuma
Warner Records albums